The Old State Capitol, also known as Old Statehouse, was the third capitol of the Commonwealth of Kentucky. The building is located in the Kentucky capital city of Frankfort and served as home of the Kentucky General Assembly from 1830 to 1910. The current Kentucky State Capitol was built in 1910. The Old State Capitol has served as a museum and the home of the Kentucky Historical Society since 1920. It has been restored to its American Civil War era appearance and was designated a U.S. National Historic Landmark in 1971 for its exceptional Greek Revival architecture, and is listed on the National Register of Historic Places.

The Kentucky legislature voted for its construction in 1827.  The building was designed in the Greek Revival style by Gideon Shryock, an early Lexington, Kentucky architect. The Old State Capitol was his first building and he was only twenty-five years old. Shryock chose the Greek Revival style to symbolically link Kentucky, a young republic, with ancient Greece, the prototype of popular democratic government.  He wanted the front of the building to duplicate the Temple of Minerva Polias at Priene.  Greek temples had no windows, therefore the front of the capitol is devoid of fenestration.  Other architectural features include a self-supporting stone stairway and a domed lantern above it to bring in sunlight.

A bitterly contested 1899 state governor election came to a climax when Democratic claimant William Goebel of Covington, Kentucky was assassinated at the capitol on his way to be inaugurated.  A plaque reading "William Goebel fell here, Jan. 30th, 1900" exists near the front entrance of the building.

See also
List of National Historic Landmarks in Kentucky
National Register of Historic Places listings in Franklin County, Kentucky

References

Kentucky Historical Society, Old State Capitol

External links

Kentucky Historical Society page on the Old State Capitol

Government buildings in Kentucky
National Historic Landmarks in Kentucky
Kentucky
Museums in Franklin County, Kentucky
History museums in Kentucky
Greek Revival architecture in Kentucky
Government buildings completed in 1837
Tourist attractions in Franklin County, Kentucky
National Register of Historic Places in Frankfort, Kentucky
1837 establishments in Kentucky
Individually listed contributing properties to historic districts on the National Register in Kentucky